Lewis Raymond Stricklyn (October 8, 1928 – May 14, 2002) was an American film actor, stage actor, television actor, soap opera star and publicist. His acting career took off with B-movie Westerns that placed his boyish good looks playing opposite top talent of the time.

Early years
Stricklyn was born in Houston, Texas; his father was a sign painter. At the age of 16 Ray Stricklyn auditioned for a part in the play Ah, Wilderness and was given the lead role. He went on to perform several roles for the Houston Little Theater.

In 1950 he won a scholarship to a New York drama school.

Career

Stage 
Stricklyn gained early acting experience in summer stock at the Litchfield (Connecticut) Summer Theatre. He made his Broadway début in A Climate of Eden by Moss Hart.

Film 
George Seaton was in New York casting his 1956 film The Proud and Profane and gave Stricklyn a one-scene role. He then moved to Los Angeles to further his film career. Stricklyn also appeared in the role of Tim Hansen in the 1958 film The Return of Dracula. After his performance in Ten North Frederick (1958), he was given a contract with 20th Century-Fox, but it wasn't renewed following The Remarkable Mr. Pennypacker (1959). His first lead role was as Jesse James in Young Jesse James (1960), and he also had roles in The Big Fisherman (1959), The Lost World (1960), The Plunderers (1960), Arizona Raiders (1965), Track of Thunder (1967) and Dogpound Shuffle (1975). However, in later years he received fewer film roles and he returned to theatre work.

Television 
Stricklyn had the role of Howard Alston Hawkins in Days of Our Lives (1991–1992). He made two guest appearances on the CBS courtroom drama series Perry Mason. In 1960 he played defendant Gerald Norton in "The Case of the Bashful Burro," and in 1963 he played Reed Brent in "The Case of the Festive Felon." He portrayed Stanley in a 1961 episode of The Tom Ewell Show. In 1966 he appeared on the World War II drama Combat!, as Private Earl Konieg in the episode "Headcount". He also appeared in episodes of popular shows like Cheers, Seinfeld, The Nanny, Wiseguy, and many more.

Other work 
Stricklyn took work in a fudge factory and then worked as a typist for a mailing company. In 1973 he joined the public relations firm John Springer Associates in Los Angeles and became one of the most influential publicists in Hollywood, working with some of the biggest names in entertainment, including Henry Fonda, Shelley Winters, Janet Leigh, Elizabeth Taylor, and Bette Davis. He also handled the US debut of the Rubik's Cube. He eventually became the head of the company's West Coast office.

In 1983 Stricklyn and Charlotte Chandler wrote a one-hour one-man show, Confessions of a Nightingale, about Tennessee Williams. Stricklyn portrayed Williams in the production, which was adapted from Chandler's interviews with Williams. Critic John Simon wrote in New York magazine: "Ray Stricklyn ... does a fine job as Williams. The accent may waver a bit, but all those small mannerisms, tics, idiosyncratic intonations, hesitancies, shifts of mood are fraught with authenticity."

Four weekend performances at the Beverly Hills Playhouse were planned but it was received so enthusiastically that it ran for over a year. Eva Marie Saint and her husband Jeffrey Hayden took out a full-page advertisement in Daily Variety urging everyone to see the show. He was twice named Best Actor of the Year by the LA Drama Critics Circle and LA Weekly. The show was then taken to Broadway and toured the US for another year. It was then performed at the Edinburgh Festival.

Personal life
In 1965 Stricklyn was introduced to a furniture refurbisher named David Galligan and they became lifetime companions. Galligan later became a noted stage director.

Later years and death
After falling ill with emphysema in 1997, he began writing his coming out autobiography. Published in 1999, Angels & Demons: One Actor's Hollywood Journey, published in Los Angeles by Belle Publishing, 297 pages,  (hardback), is a candid and witty account of a man who, Stricklyn wrote, "might qualify as one who has had his 15 minutes in the limelight; perhaps even 20."

On May 14, 2002, Stricklyn died of emphysema in Los Angeles. He is survived by his sister, Mary Ann, and his longtime companion, Los Angeles stage director David Galligan.

Partial filmography

Film

Television

Seinfeld - Clarence (season 8, Episode 10: "The Andrea Doria") - 1996

Cheers - Ed (season 9, Episode 16: "Wedding Bell Blues") - 1991

Awards
Stricklyn received a Theatre World Award in 1952–1953 for his work in The Climate of Eden. He was nominated for two Golden Globe awards:
 1958 – New Star Of The Year – Actor – 10 North Frederick
 1960 – Best Performance by an Actor in a Supporting Role in any Motion Picture – The Plunderers.

Press cuttings
Ray Stricklyn: Actor whose boyish looks became a hindrance Obituary by Tom Vallance in The Independent, 29th. May 2002, page 18. "Stricklyn stated that two factors had contributed to his lack of progress. First, his homosexuality (though he had well-publicised relationships with Joan Collins and Bette Davis) and secondly, his persistently youthful appearance."

Notable Quotes
 I was 27 and still looked 16, but there was a whole new crop of boys coming up who really were that age. I'd thought my career was going straight up. So like a lot of foolish young actors, I started living beyond my means. I bought expensive cars, got into debt. Once you think you're going to be a star, then you're not—it's a rude awakening.

References
 
 The New York Times / Ray Stricklyn

External links

Further reading
Young, Jordan R. (1989). Acting Solo: The Art of One-Person Shows. Beverly Hills: Past Times Publishing Co.

1928 births
2002 deaths
20th-century American male actors
American male film actors
American male stage actors
American male television actors
Deaths from emphysema
American gay actors
LGBT people from Texas
Male Western (genre) film actors
Male actors from Houston
20th-century LGBT people